Edens Lost is a 1989 Australian mini-series based on the novel of the same title by Sumner Locke Elliott, produced by Australian Broadcasting Corporation (ABC) and 
Central Independent Television.

Gillian Armstrong and Margaret Fink had planned to make a film version in the late 70s.

The budget was $A3.9 million.

Cast

 Julia Blake - Eve
 Arthur Dignam - Heath
 Linda Cropper - Stevie
 Victoria Longley - Bea
 Bruce Hughes - Angus
 Jennifer Claire - Cissie
 Melanie Salomon - Lesley-Ann
 Fiona Press - Liesl
 Yves Stening - Tip
 Andrew Tighe - Bill Seward
 Patrick Quinn - Corey
 Philip Sayer - Marcus
 Pat Bishop - Muffet
 Edward Wiley - Gabriel
 Betty Bobbitt - Mabel

References

External links

1989 Australian television series debuts
1989 Australian television series endings
Australian Broadcasting Corporation original programming
1980s Australian television miniseries
ITV television dramas
Television series by ITV Studios
English-language television shows
Television shows produced by Central Independent Television